The South American Football Confederation (CONMEBOL, or CSF;) is the continental governing body of football in South America (apart from Guyana, Suriname and French Guiana) and it is one of FIFA's six continental confederations. The oldest continental confederation in the world, its headquarters are located in Luque, Paraguay, near Asunción. CONMEBOL is responsible for the organization and governance of South American football's major international tournaments. With 10 member soccer associations, it has the fewest members of all the confederations in FIFA.

CONMEBOL national teams have won ten FIFA World Cups (Brazil five, Argentina three and Uruguay two) and CONMEBOL clubs have won 22 Intercontinental Cups and four FIFA Club World Cups. Argentina, Brazil and Uruguay have won two Olympic gold medals each. It is considered one of the strongest confederations in the world.

The World Cup qualifiers of CONMEBOL have been described as the "toughest qualifiers in the world" for their simple round-robin system, entry of some of the top national teams in the world, leveling of the weaker national teams, climate conditions, geographic conditions, strong home stands and passionate supporters.

Juan Ángel Napout (Paraguay) was the president of CONMEBOL until 3 December 2015 when he was arrested in a raid in Switzerland as part of the U.S. Justice Department's bribery case involving FIFA. Wilmar Valdez (Uruguay) was interim president until 26 January 2016 when Alejandro Domínguez (Paraguay) was elected president. The Vice presidents are Ramón Jesurum (Colombia), Laureano González (Venezuela) and Arturo Salah (Chile).

History
In 1916, the first edition of the "Campeonato Sudamericano de Fútbol" (South-American Football Championship), now known as the "Copa América", was contested in Argentina to commemorate the centenary of the Argentine Declaration of Independence. The four participating associations of that tournament gathered together in Buenos Aires in order to officially create a governing body to facilitate the organization of the tournament. Thus, CONMEBOL was founded on 9 July 1916 under the initiative of Uruguayan Héctor Rivadavia Gómez, but approved by the football associations of Argentina, Brazil, Chile and Uruguay. The first Constitutional Congress on 15 December of that same year, which took place in Montevideo, ratified the decision.

Over the years, with the last being Venezuela in 1952. Guyana, Suriname and the French overseas department of French Guiana, while geographically in South America, are not part of CONMEBOL. Consisting of a former British territory, a former Dutch territory and a French territory, they are part of the Confederation of North, Central American and Caribbean Association Football (CONCACAF), mainly due to historical, cultural and sporting reasons. With ten member nations, CONMEBOL is the smallest and the only fully continental land-based FIFA confederation (no insular countries or associates from different continents).

Leadership

Executive committee

Past presidents

Notes

Members

There are sovereign states or dependencies in South America which are not affiliated with CONMEBOL but are members of other confederations or do not have affiliation with any other confederations at all.
Guyana (CONCACAF)
Suriname (CONCACAF)
French Guiana (CONCACAF)
Falkland Islands

Competitions

CONMEBOL competitions

National teams:
 Copa América
 CONMEBOL Men Pre-Olympic Tournament
 South American Under-20 Football Championship
 South American Under-17 Football Championship
 South American Under-15 Football Championship
 Copa América Femenina
 South American Under-20 Women's Football Championship
 South American Under-17 Women's Football Championship
 Copa América de Futsal
 FIFA Futsal World Cup qualifiers
 South American Futsal League
 South American Under-20 Futsal Championship
 South American Under-17 Futsal Championship
 Copa América Femenina de Futsal
 South American Under-20 Women's Futsal Championship
 Copa América de Beach Soccer
 FIFA Beach Soccer World Cup qualifiers
 South American Beach Soccer League
 South American Under-20 Beach Soccer Championship
 Superclásico de las Américas

Clubs:
 Copa Libertadores
 Copa Sudamericana
 Recopa Sudamericana
 Copa Libertadores Femenina
 Copa Libertadores de Futsal
 Copa Libertadores de Beach Soccer
 U-20 Copa Libertadores
Defunct
 Supercopa Libertadores
 Copa CONMEBOL
 South American Championship of Champions
 Copa Ganadores de Copa
 Copa de Oro
 Copa Mercosur
 Copa Merconorte
 Copa Master de Supercopa
 Copa Master de CONMEBOL

Inter Continental:
 CONMEBOL–UEFA Cup of Champions
 Women's Finalissima
 Futsal Finalissima
 Under-20 Intercontinental Cup
Defunct
 J.League Cup / Copa Sudamericana Championship
 Intercontinental Champions' Supercup
 Copa Interamericana
 Copa Iberoamericana
 Intercontinental Cup

International
The main competition for men's national teams is the Copa América, which started in 1916. The Copa America is the only continental competition in which teams from a totally different continent and confederation can be invited to participate. CONMEBOL usually selects and invites a couple of teams from the AFC or CONCACAF to participate in the Copa America. Japan and Qatar were invited to participate in the 2019 edition of the Copa America. CONMEBOL also runs national competitions at Under-20, Under-17 and Under-15 levels. For women's national teams, CONMEBOL operates the Copa América Femenina for senior national sides, as well as Under-20 and Under-17 championships.

In futsal, there is the Copa América de Futsal and Campeonato Sudamericano de Futsal Sub-20. The Campeonato Sudamericano Femenino de Futsal is the women's equivalent to the men's tournament.

Club
CONMEBOL also runs the two main club competitions in South America: the Copa Libertadores was first held in 1960 and the Copa Sudamericana was launched by CONMEBOL in 2002 as an indirect successor to the Supercopa Libertadores (begun in 1988). A third competition, the Copa CONMEBOL, started in 1992 and was abolished in 1999. In women's football, CONMEBOL also conducts the Copa Libertadores Femenina for club teams. The competition was first held in 2009.

The Recopa Sudamericana is an annual match between the past year's winners of the Copa Libertadores and the winners of the Copa Sudamericana (previously the winners of the Supercopa Libertadores) and came into being in 1989.

The Intercontinental Cup was jointly organized with UEFA between the Copa Libertadores and the UEFA Champions League winners.

Current title holders

FIFA World Rankings

Overview

Historical leaders
Men's

Team of the year

Other rankings

Clubs

Football Database rankings

Last updated: 9 January 2022

IFFHS

Last updated on: 12 March 2019 –

Beach soccer national teams

Men's update: 31 January 2022.

Major tournament records 
Legend
  – Champion
  – Runner-up
  – Third place
  – Fourth place
 QF – Quarter-finals (1934–1938, 1954–1970, and 1986–present: knockout round of 8)
 R2 – Round 2 (1974–1978, second group stage, top 8; 1982: second group stage, top 12; 1986–2022: knockout round of 16)
 R1 – Round 1 (1930, 1950–1970 and 1986–present: group stage; 1934–1938: knockout round of 16; 1974–1982: first group stage)
 Q – Qualified for upcoming tournament
  – Did not qualify
  – Did not enter / Withdrew / Banned
  – Hosts

For each tournament, the flag of the host country and the number of teams in each finals tournament (in brackets) are shown.

FIFA World Cup

FIFA Women's World Cup

Olympic Games For Men

Olympic Games For Women

Copa América

Copa América Femenina

FIFA U-20 World Cup

FIFA U-20 Women's World Cup

FIFA U-17 World Cup 

 Note 1: Original hosts Peru were stripped of the right to host the 2019 event in February 2019.

FIFA U-17 Women's World Cup

FIFA Futsal World Cup

FIFA Beach Soccer World Cup

Former tournaments

FIFA Confederations Cup

Corruption

On 27 May 2015, several CONMEBOL leaders were arrested in Zürich, Switzerland by Swiss police and indicted by the U.S. Department of Justice on charges of corruption, money laundering, and racketeering. Those swept up in the operation include former CONMEBOL presidents Eugenio Figueredo and Nicolás Léoz and several football federations presidents such as Carlos Chávez and Sergio Jadue. On 3 December 2015, the CONMEBOL President Juan Ángel Napout was also arrested.

See also
 CONMEBOL Jubilee Awards
 List of association football competitions
 International Federation of Association Football (FIFA)
 Union of European Football Associations (UEFA)
 Confederation of North, Central American and Caribbean Association Football (CONCACAF)
 Confederation of African Football (CAF)
 Asian Football Confederation (AFC)
 Oceania Football Confederation (OFC)

Notes

References

External links

  

 
 
Sports organisations of Paraguay
Sports organizations established in 1916
Central Department
FIFA confederations
1916 establishments in South America